Tommy Matthias  (born 7 November 1890) was a Welsh international footballer. He was part of the Wales national football team between 1914 and 1923, playing 12 matches. He played his first match on 28 February 1914 against Scotland and his last match on 17 March 1923 against Scotland.

See also
 List of Wales international footballers (alphabetical)

References

1890 births
Wrexham A.F.C. players
Welsh footballers
Wales international footballers
Place of birth missing
Year of death missing
Association footballers not categorized by position